Tiny Computers was a British computer manufacturer based in Salfords, Surrey, England. The company went into administration due to substantial losses in January 2002 and was subsequently purchased by rival OEM Time Group.

History 
Tiny Computers enjoyed great success during the latter half of the 1990s, having retail units throughout the United Kingdom as well as launching in the United States and the Far East. The company claimed to have sold 400,000 units in 2000, and signed a contract worth £40m with Scottish manufacturer Fullarton Computer Industries in August 2001.

Customer Service Issues 
Tiny Computers acquired the rather dubious acronym "Tough It's Now Yours" which was based around their customer service once a product had been sold.  Calls to a premium rate 0906 number (50p per minute back in the 1990s) were frequently answered by staff with an apathetic attitude to the customer's issue.

Tiny cited reduced air freight fees and a shorter, more efficient supply chain as their reason for choosing a firm based in the United Kingdom over Asian OEMs who had lower base costs. However, due to increasing competition in the consumer PC market, their profits eventually began to fall, and in the beginning of 2002, they went into administration and were subsequently purchased by rival TIME.

Innovations

Home theater PC 
In March 2001, the company released one of the first home theater PCs, called the Takami system. The PC was contained in a flat case with a similar form factor to a VHS player, and was intended to be placed under a television rather than at a computer desk as was typical during the 1990s. Bundles including a plasma television and other home cinema equipment were also sold.

Despite its innovative nature, the Takami was not a commercial success, with only 5,000 units being sold during 2001.

Tiny Trainer 
In 2000, in an attempt to make computing easier for those who had little to no experience with PCs, Tiny commissioned e-learning company VSI Communications Group to create a 'virtual mentor' named Tiny Trainer. An interactive animation ran automatically when the PC first booted up and gave users a brief introduction to computers in general, the Windows operating system as well as Tiny's own online services.

Tiny Trainer was based on the same technology platform as VSI's Mentor interactive help series, and was tightly integrated with a Tiny specific Windows ME version of Mentor that also came bundled on Tiny's computers.

Sponsorship
Tiny sponsored Wimbledon F.C. shirts between 1999 and 2000.

References 

Defunct companies based in Surrey
Defunct computer companies of the United Kingdom
Computer companies disestablished in 2002
Computer companies established in 1990
Companies that have entered administration in the United Kingdom
Defunct computer hardware companies